Marco Octávio Simoes Barbosa (or simply Marco Octavio) is a Brazilian beach soccer and football coach. He is currently the head coach of the Iran national beach soccer team.

Octávio guided Brazil to four BSWW Mundialito titles, which remains a record.

His coaching ability did not go unnoticed in Asia and he was given a job in United Arab Emirates before assuming the Chinese controls in 2006. He masterminded China's rebuilding process and did take the East Asians to the level where they were capable to compete against the continent's best.

Octávio has also coached professional clubs, including Bahia and Shirin Faraz. He has qualified Iran to the 2015 FIFA Beach Soccer World Cup.

Career
 Brazil national beach soccer team
 Portugal national beach soccer team
 United Arab Emirates national beach soccer team
 China national beach soccer team
 Esporte Clube Bahia (2003–2004)
 Iran national beach soccer team (2007)
 Shirin Faraz (2007–2008)
 Iran national beach soccer team (2010)
 Iran national beach soccer team (2012–2015)
 Iran national beach soccer team (2017–2019)

References

Brazilian football managers
Expatriate football managers in Iran
Beach soccer coaches
Living people
Year of birth missing (living people)